Kairasi is a 1960 Indian Tamil-language film directed by K. Shankar and produced by N. Vasudeva Menon. The film stars Gemini Ganesan (credited as Ganesh) and B. Saroja Devi. It revolves around a doctor whose father is wrongfully convicted.

Kairasi was released on 19 October 1960, during Diwali, and became a commercial success. It was later remade in Hindi as Jhoola (1962).

Plot 

Sundaram, an honest police constable, is falsely accused of murder and subsequently imprisoned. Ramanathan, a judge, adopts Sundaram's son, Mohan, who goes on to become a successful doctor.

Cast 

Male cast
 Gemini Ganesh as Mohan
 K. A. Thangavelu as Madhu
 M. R. Radha as Kumar
 S. V. Sahasranamam as Sundaram
 K. D. Santhanam as Judge Ramanathan
 (Appalachari) Rama Rao as Lord
 C. S. Pandian as Somu
 P. D. Sambandam as Sambandam
 V. P. S. Mani as Sekhar
 K. Natarajan as Dr. Shankar
 G. K. Pillai as Sub-Inspector
Male supporting cast
 Mahalingam, Karikol Rajoo, Rathnam,Balakrishnan, V. T. Kalyanam, and Maruthappa.

Female cast
 B. Saroja Devi as Sumathi
 M. V. Rajamma as Lakshmi
 K. Malathi as Kanakam
 Mohana as Kokila
 Ramani as Susheela
 Chellam as Chellam
 Pushpamala as Angamuthu
Female supporting cast
 Seethalakshmi, Ramamani Bai, Santha Kumari, and Baby Mangalam.

Production 
Kairasi was directed by K. Shankar, who doubled as editor. N. Vasudeva Menon produced the film under Vasu Films, and this was his second film as producer. The story was written by Kothamangalam Sadanandan, while the dialogues were written by K. S. Gopalakrishnan and K. D. Santhanam, who also appeared onscreen as a judge. Cinematography was handled by Thambu, and K. Narayanan co-edited the film, while A. Balu was the art director. The final cut of the film measured 163 minutes.

Soundtrack 
The music was composed by R. Govardhanam. The lyrics were written by Kannadasan, Kothamangalam Subbu and K. S. Gopalakrishnan. Music historian Vamanan wrote that Kairasi "brought out the best in Govardhanam, with its limpid melodies brimming forth sweetly with lyrical intimations of love and romance."

Release and reception 
Kairasi was released on 19 October 1960, during Diwali. It was distributed by Solar Film Distributors in Madras, and other distributors in other districts in Tamil Nadu. The Indian Express positively reviewed the film, praising the performances of Ganesh, Rajamma, Sahasranamam and Radha, as well as the songs written by Kannadasan and the title track written by Subbu. Despite facing competition from Mannathi Mannan, Petra Manam, and Paavai Vilakku, released on the same day, the film became a commercial success.

References

External links 
 

1960 films
1960s Tamil-language films
Films about miscarriage of justice
Films directed by K. Shankar
Films with screenplays by K. S. Gopalakrishnan